German submarine U-562 was a Type VIIC U-boat built for Nazi Germany's Kriegsmarine for service during World War II.
She was laid down on 7 February 1940 by Blohm & Voss in Hamburg as yard number 538, launched on 24 January 1941 and commissioned on 20 March 1941 under Oberleutnant zur See Herwig Collmann.

Design
German Type VIIC submarines were preceded by the shorter Type VIIB submarines. U-562 had a displacement of  when at the surface and  while submerged. She had two shafts and two  propellers.

U-562 was fitted with five  torpedo tubes (four fitted at the bow and one at the stern), fourteen torpedoes, one  SK C/35 naval gun, 220 rounds, and a  C/30 anti-aircraft gun. The boat had a complement of between forty-four and sixty.

Service history
The boat's service began on 20 March 1941 with training as part of the 1st U-boat Flotilla. She transferred to the 29th Flotilla on 1 January 1942 for active service, in the Mediterranean.

Fate
U-562 was sunk on 19 February 1943 in the Mediterranean Sea NE of Bengazi in position , by a RAF Wellington bomber of 38 Squadron together with Royal Navy vessels, the destroyer  and destroyer escort . All 49 hands were lost.

Wolfpacks
U-562 took part in two wolfpacks, namely:
 Bosemüller (28 August – 2 September 1941)
 Brandenburg (15 September – 2 October 1941)

Summary of raiding history

See also
 Mediterranean U-boat Campaign (World War II)

References

Bibliography

External links

German Type VIIC submarines
Ships lost with all hands
1941 ships
U-boats commissioned in 1941
U-boats sunk by depth charges
U-boats sunk in 1943
U-boats sunk by British warships
U-boats sunk by British aircraft
World War II submarines of Germany
World War II shipwrecks in the Mediterranean Sea
Ships built in Hamburg
Maritime incidents in February 1943